NARAL Pro-Choice America, commonly known as simply NARAL, is a non-profit 501(c)(4) organization in the United States that engages in lobbying, political action, and advocacy efforts to oppose restrictions on abortion, to expand access to abortion and birth control, and to support paid parental leave and protection against pregnancy discrimination.

NARAL is associated with the NARAL Pro-Choice America Foundation, a  501(c)(3) organization, and the NARAL Pro-Choice America PAC, a political action committee. Founded in 1969, NARAL is the oldest extant abortion rights advocacy group in the United States, though it was predated by a few now-defunct groups including the Society for Humane Abortion and the Association for the Study of Abortion.

History
The precursor to NARAL was the Association to Repeal Abortion Laws (ARAL). ARAL was an expansion of the "Army of Three" which was made up of abortion rights activists Pat Maginnis, Rowena Gurner, and financial investor Lana Phelan. The Army of Three organized and distributed referral lists of people performing illegal abortions and held classes on do-it-yourself abortions in California.

Originally called the National Association for the Repeal of Abortion Laws, NARAL was established at the "First National Conference on Abortion Laws: Modification or Repeal?" held February 14–16, 1969, in Chicago. Its formation was announced on the front page of The New York Times. The conference, sponsored by 21 organizations and attended by 350 people, included a planning session for NARAL and the report of NARAL's pre-formation planning committee: Lawrence Lader of New York City, Garrett Hardin of California, and Dr. Lonny Myers of Chicago. Key conference speakers included obstetrician/gynecologist Bernard Nathanson (who later became an anti-abortion activist), journalist Lawrence Lader, and women's rights advocate Betty Friedan. The conference was split between those favoring abortion law "reform" and those favoring "repeal". The more conservative reform position would involve adopting something like the American Law Institute guidelines, which would liberalize existing abortion law by allowing abortion to preserve the physical or mental health of the mother, or in the case of pregnancies resulting from rape or incest. The repeal position, led by Betty Friedan and Conni Bille, favored "ad libitum" abortion rights at the discretion of the mother. The conference voted to adopt the more radical repeal position.

Those agents attending the session elected a 12-person Planning Committee for NARAL's formation: Lawrence Lader (Chairman), Ruth Proskauer Smith (Vice-Chair), Ruth Cusack (Secretary), Beatrice McClintock (Treasurer), Constance Bille Finnerty (Secretary), Mrs. Marc Hughes Fisher, Betty Friedan, Norval Morris, Stewart Mott, Dr. Bernard Nathanson, Edna Smith, and Percy Sutton. The committee held its first official meeting in New York on February 25, 1969. It hired Lee Gidding as the first Executive Director; she opened NARAL's office in New York City on March 3.

Several founding leaders, including Lader and Proskauer Smith, were previously active in the more conservative, pro-reform Association for the Study of Abortion founded in 1965. A number were also active in groups associated with the population movement, such as the Association for Voluntary Sterilization and Zero Population Growth.

The Planning Committee, meeting regularly between February and September 1969, defined NARAL's purpose and program, drafted bylaws to submit to the membership for approval, prepared a slate to run for the Board of Directors, and directed NARAL's activities. The Committee defined NARAL's purpose as follows:

NARAL, recognizing the fundamental human right of a woman to limit her own reproduction, is dedicated to eliminating all laws and practices that would compel any woman to bear a child against her will. To that end, it proposes to initiate and co-ordinate political, social, and legal action of individuals and groups concerned with providing safe operations by qualified physicians for all women seeking them, regardless of economic status.

The original NARAL program had six parts:

 Assist in the formation in all states of direct political action groups dedicated to the purpose of NARAL;
 Serve as a clearinghouse for activities related to NARAL's purpose;
 Create new materials for mass distribution which tell the repeal story dramatically and succinctly;
 Train field workers to organize and stimulate legislative action;
 Suggest direct action projects;
 Raise funds for the above activities.

The Board of Directors, elected by the membership, officially replaced the Planning Committee at the first Board meeting, held on September 27, 1969. The Board elected Honorary Officers (Co-Presidents Dr. Lester Breslow and Congresswoman Shirley Chisholm and Senator Maurine Neuberger as Vice President), Officers (including New York City Councilwoman Carol Greitzer as President), an Executive Committee (Lawrence Lader, Chairman), and a Nominating Committee. In addition, the Board adopted a very specific program of action that focused on winning repeal in New York and other key states. Only one year after NARAL's formation, the New York state legislature voted to legalize abortion, and the new law went into effect on July 1, 1970. On that day, NARAL held a medical conference at NYU Medical School to train physicians in non-hospital abortion techniques.

From 1969 until early 1973, NARAL worked with other groups to repeal state abortion laws and oversee the implementation of abortion policies in those few states that had liberalized their laws. On January 22, 1973, in Roe v. Wade, the U.S. Supreme Court held that, during the first three months of pregnancy, abortion should be a private decision between a woman and her doctor, and that during the second three months, state regulation should be permitted only to protect the health of the woman. To reflect the Court's repeal of restrictive laws, NARAL became the National Abortion Rights Action League in late 1973.

In 2003, the organization dropped the long form name in favor of "NARAL Pro-Choice America". That same year, the organization launched a massive television and print campaign, to make abortion a key issue in the 2004 elections.

From 1987 until 2006, Ann McGuiness was development director of NARAL.

National executive directors
Karen Mulhauser served as the first national executive director from 1974 to 1982.The next NARAL leader was Nanette Falkenburg, who served from 1982 until 1985; Kate Michelman became the next director until she announced her retirement in 2004. Nancy Keenan, formerly the Montana Superintendent of Schools, became President of NARAL and served until February 2013. Ilyse Hogue was the group's president from 2013 to 2021. In November 2021, NARAL announced the hire of their current president, Mini Timmaraju, who is the first woman of color to lead the organization.

Activities

NARAL Pro-Choice America uses numerous tactics to lobby for access to abortion and birth control in the U.S., as well as to promote paid parental leave and stop pregnancy discrimination. They track state and federal legislation,  endorse candidates, and run advertising and education campaigns on these issues. 

It sponsors lawsuits against governments and hospitals, donates money to politicians supportive of abortion rights through its political action committee, and organizes its members to contact members of Congress and urge them to support NARAL's positions. NARAL sponsored the March for Women's Lives in 2004. NARAL also sponsors public sex education, and tracks state and national legislation affecting laws regarding abortion, women's health and rights.

In 2005, NARAL Pro-Choice America was criticized for an ad campaign that targeted U.S. Supreme Court chief justice nominee John Roberts, and withdrew the ad.  The ad featured anti-abortion violence survivor Emily Lyons, and claimed that as U.S. Deputy Solicitor-General, Roberts had supported "violent fringe groups and a convicted clinic bomber". While Roberts did argue before the Supreme Court that a 19th-century statute directed against the Ku Klux Klan did not apply to protesters outside abortion clinics, the case in question occurred almost seven years before the 1998 bombing shown in the ad. The ad was retracted under pressure from other pro-abortion rights groups, as undercutting the credibility of the abortion rights cause.  

In 2006, NARAL was criticized by some other pro-abortion rights political activists for supporting former Republicans Lincoln Chafee and Michael Bloomberg, and for supporting moderate or conservative Democrats.

See also
 Abortion Law Reform Association (ALRA) — British contemporary organisation

References

External links

 NARAL Pro-Choice Minnesota's records are available at the Minnesota Historical Society.
Records, 1968–1976. Schlesinger Library, Radcliffe Institute, Harvard University.
Records of NARAL Pro-Choice Massachusetts, 1972–2008. Schlesinger Library, Radcliffe Institute, Harvard University.

Abortion-rights organizations in the United States
1969 establishments in the United States
Lobbying organizations in the United States